Hey Zeus! (stylized as hey Zeus!) is the seventh studio album by American rock band X. The tracks "Country at War" and "New Life" peaked at No. 15 and No. 26, respectively, on the Billboard Modern Rock Tracks chart.

Track listing
All tracks composed by Exene Cervenka and John Doe; except where noted.
"Someone's Watching" (John Doe, Tony Gilkyson) – 4:49
"Big Blue House" – 4:05
"Clean Like Tomorrow" – 3:58
"New Life" – 3:24
"Country at War" – 4:16
"Arms for Hostages" – 3:36
"Into the Light" (John Doe, Tony Gilkyson) – 3:57
"Lettuce and Vodka" (Duke McVinnie) – 5:07
"Everybody" – 3:32
"Baby You Lied" – 3:18
"Drawn in the Dark" – 5:55

Personnel
X
Exene Cervenka – vocals
John Doe – vocals, bass
Tony Gilkyson – guitar, vocals
D.J. Bonebrake – percussion, drums, marimba
with:
Patrick Warren, Tony Berg - keyboards
Technical personnel
Tony Berg – producer
Tchad Blake – engineer, mixing
Dale Lavi – photographer
Casey McMackin – engineer
Brian Schuebie – engineer

References

1993 albums
X (American band) albums
Albums produced by Tony Berg